Ptilostomis is a genus of giant casemakers in the family Phryganeidae. There are at least four described species in Ptilostomis.

Species
These four species belong to the genus Ptilostomis:
 Ptilostomis angustipennis (Hagen, 1873)
 Ptilostomis ocellifera (Walker, 1852)
 Ptilostomis postica (Walker, 1852)
 Ptilostomis semifasciata (Say, 1828)

References

Further reading

External links

 

Trichoptera genera
Articles created by Qbugbot